"Mauvaise foi nocturne (la réponse)" (French for "Nocturnal dishonesty (the response)") is a 2006 song recorded by French act Fatal Bazooka, led by actor, singer and comedian Michael Youn. Pascal Obispo participated also in the vocals under the name of Vitoo. The song is the eleventh track on the album T'As Vu ?, and was released as second single in the first days of March 2007. It was as successful as "Fous ta cagoule" in terms of chart positions, becoming a number-one hit in France and Belgium (Wallonia).

Song information 
The song is a parody of Diam's' song "Confessions nocturnes", recorded with Vitaa as featuring, and included on the album Dans ma bulle. Michaël Youn portrayed Diam's, while Pascal Obispo plays the role of Vitaa. In Fatal Bazooka's music video, there are also many references to the original one by Diam's.

The video was nominated at the 2008 Victoires de la musique in the category "Best music video of the year", but it didn't win.

In France, the single went straight to number six on 3 March 2007, two days after its release. Then it climbed to number-one, where it stayed for five weeks (it was Youn's fourth number-one single in France). Thereafter, it dropped slowly but regularly on the chart, totaling 12 weeks in the top ten, 19 weeks in the top 50 and 31 weeks on the chart (top 100).

In Belgium (Wallonia), "Mauvaise foi nocturne" was charted for 26 weeks in the top 40. It entered the chart at number 29 on 3 March, climbed quickly and eventually reached number-one from its fifth to its ninth week. It remained in the top five for another six weeks, then dropped.

The single was less successful in Switzerland, peaking at number 15 on 1 April 2007 and staying in the top 100 for 15 weeks.

Track listings
 CD single
 "Mauvaise foi nocturne (la réponse)" — 6:07
 "Fous ta cagoule" (live in Chambéry 07) by Fatal Bazooka — 4:24

 CD maxi
 "Mauvaise foi nocturne (la réponse)" (full version) — 3:53
 "Fous ta cagoule" (live in Chambéry 07) by Fatal Bazooka — 3:46
 "Mauvaise foi nocturne (la réponse)" (music video)

 Digital download
 "Mauvaise foi nocturne (la réponse)" — 3:53

Charts and sales

Peak positions

End of year charts

Certifications

References 

2006 songs
2007 singles
French hip hop songs
Michaël Youn songs
Ultratop 50 Singles (Wallonia) number-one singles
SNEP Top Singles number-one singles
Musical parodies
Pascal Obispo songs
Male vocal duets
Songs written by Diam's